Kapiton Stepanovich Pavlov (1791 – 1 January 1852) was a Ukrainian portrait painter.  A native of Reval (now Tallinn), he was the son of a government official.  He graduated from the Academy in St. Petersburg in 1815, after which he went to Ukraine; there, he spent thirty years painting.  From 1820 until 1829 he taught painting at the gymnasium in Nizhyn.  He also taught at Kyiv University from 1839 until 1841.

References
 Russian Portrait [sic] of the 18th and 19th century (exhibition catalog).  Moscow, 1976.

1791 births
1852 deaths
People from Tallinn
People from the Governorate of Estonia
19th-century painters from the Russian Empire
Ukrainian male painters
Academic staff of the Taras Shevchenko National University of Kyiv
19th-century male artists from the Russian Empire